The 2013 Icelandic Cup, also known as the Borgunarbikar for sponsorship reasons, was the 54th edition of the Icelandic national football cup. It began with the first round on 30 April 2013 and ended on 17 August 2013. The final was played at Laugardalsvöllur, the Icelandic national stadium, and was won by Fram, who beat Stjarnan in a penalty shoot-out after the match had finished 3–3. It was Fram's eighth Icelandic Cup triumph, and their first since 1989.

First round
The First Round consisted of 38 teams from the lower Icelandic levels and 6 clubs from the 2. deild karla. The 20 matches were played between 30 April and 4 May 2013. Two teams, Stál-úlfur and Fjarðabyggð, were given walkovers after their opponents withdrew from the competition.

Second round
The Second Round consisted of the 20 winning teams of the First Round, Stál-úlfur and Fjarðabyggð who had walkovers in the First Round, the remaining 6 teams from the 2. deild karla and the 12 teams from the 1. deild karla. The 20 matches were played between 10 May and 14 May 2013.

Third round
The Third Round consisted of the 20 winning teams of the Second Round and the 12 teams from the Úrvalsdeild. The 16 matches were played on 29 May and 30 May 2013.

Round of 16
The draw for the last 16 was made on 3 June 2013 at the headquarters of the KSÍ.

Quarter-finals

Semifinals

Final

References

External links 
 Official site 

2013 in Icelandic football
2013 domestic association football cups
2013